Na Yia is a district (amphoe) in the central part of Ubon Ratchathani province, northeastern Thailand.

History
Na Yia was separated from Det Udom district to create a minor district (king amphoe) on 31 May 1993.

On 15 May 2007, all 81 minor districts were upgraded to full districts. On 24 August the upgrade became official.

Geography
Neighboring districts are (from the north clockwise) Sawang Wirawong, Phibun Mangsahan, Det Udom and Warin Chamrap.

Administration
The district is divided into three sub-districts (tambons), which are further subdivided into 34 villages (mubans). Na Yia is a township (thesaban tambon) which covers parts of tambon Na Yia. There are a further three tambon administrative organizations (TAO).

References

External links
amphoe.com

Na Yia